Eric Descheenie is an American politician and a former Democratic member of the Arizona House of Representatives elected to represent District 7 in 2016, retiring in 2019. He is currently the Director of Tribal Government Relations for the Navajo County Board of Supervisors. He has also served as a Tribal Liaison to the Arizona Department of Housing and the Governor's Office of Equal Opportunity.

Elections
 2016 – Descheenie and Wenona Benally were unopposed in the Democratic Primary and the general election.
 2014 – Descheenie lost the District 7 senate Democratic primary to incumbent Carlyle Begay. Begay would later switch to the Republican Party in 2015.

References

External links
 Biography at Ballotpedia
 Vote Smart

21st-century American politicians
Democratic Party members of the Arizona House of Representatives
Living people
Native American state legislators in Arizona
Year of birth missing (living people)
People from Chinle, Arizona
Arizona State University alumni
Navajo people
21st-century Native Americans